RMD may refer to:
 Gas metal arc welding#Modified short-circuiting 
 Required minimum distribution from an individual retirement account (IRA) or qualified retirement plan in the United States 
 RMD Engineering College, a self-financing college in Chennai, Tamil Nadu
 GDP-4-dehydro-6-deoxy-D-mannose reductase
 Richard Mofe Damijo (popularly known as RMD), Nigerian actor
 Rhythmic movement disorder
 Richmond station (London), by National Rail station code
 Raytheon Missiles & Defense